Wright Marion Morris (January 6, 1910 – April 25, 1998) was an American novelist, photographer, and essayist.  He is known for his portrayals of the people and artifacts of the Great Plains in words and pictures, as well as for experimenting with narrative forms.

Early life

Morris was born in Central City, Nebraska; his boyhood home is on the National Register of Historic Places.  His mother, Grace Osborn Morris, died six days after he was born.  His father, William Henry Morris, worked for the Union Pacific Railroad.  After Grace's death, Wright was cared for by a nanny, until his father made a trip to Omaha and returned with a young wife, Gertrude.  In Will's Boy, Morris states, "Gertrude was closer to my age than to my father's".  Gertrude hated small-town life, but got along famously with Wright, as they shared many of the same childish tastes (both loved games, movies, and ice cream).  In 1919, the family moved to Omaha, where they resided until 1924.

During that interlude, Morris spent two summers on his uncle's farm near Norfolk, Nebraska.  Photographs of the farm, as well as the real-life characters of Uncle Harry and Aunt Clara, appear in Morris's books.

Career

Morris moved to Chicago in 1924.  Later that year, he accompanied his father on a road trip to the west coast that formed the basis for his first novel, My Uncle Dudley.  He also lived briefly with his uncle in Texas before enrolling in Pacific Union College in California. He graduated from Pomona College in 1933.  He married Mary Ellen Finfrock in 1934; the couple divorced in 1959.  He later married Josephine Mary Kantor.

Following college, Morris traveled through Europe on a "wanderjahr," which he later fictionalized in Cause for Wonder.

From 1944 to 1954, Morris lived in Philadelphia.  From 1954–1962, he divided his time between California and Mexico.  In 1963, he accepted a teaching position at San Francisco State College.  He retired from teaching in 1975.

Morris won the National Book Award for The Field of Vision in 1956.  His final novel, Plains Song won the American Book Award in 1981.

Morris developed close friendships with several other American authors, most notably John O'Hara and Thornton Wilder, and was a pall bearer at O'Hara's funeral in 1970.  He also conducted a weekly correspondence with Scottish author Muriel Spark from 1962 until his death.

Morris died of esophageal cancer in Mill Valley, California in 1998.  He is buried in the Chapman Cemetery.

Selected works
 My Uncle Dudley (1942)
 The Man Who Was There (1945)
 The Inhabitants (photo-text) (1946)
 The Home Place (photo-text) (1948)
 The World in the Attic (1949)
 Man and Boy (1951)
 The Works of Love  (1952)
 The Deep Sleep (1953)
 The Huge Season (1954) — finalist for the National Book Award
 The Field of Vision (1956) — National Book Award for Fiction
 Love Among the Cannibals (1957) — finalist for the National Book Award
 Ceremony in Lone Tree (1960) — finalist for National Book Award
 Cause for Wonder (1963)
 One Day (1965)
 In Orbit (1967)
 A Bill of Rites, a Bill of Wrongs, a Bill of Goods (essays) (1968)
 God's Country and My People (photo-text) (1968)
 Fire Sermon (1971)
 A Life (1973)
 Real Losses, Imaginary Gains  (Short Stories)  (1976)
 The Fork River Space Project (1977)
 Plains Song: For Female Voices (1980) — National Book Award for Fiction
 Will's Boy (1981)
 "Victrola" (1982) (short story in The New Yorker; O. Henry Award third prize)  
 Solo (1983)
 A Cloak of Light (1985)
 "Glimpse Into Another Country" (1985) (short story in The New Yorker; O. Henry Award)
 Time Pieces: Photographs, Writing, and Memory (1989)

Awards and honors

Morris received numerous honors in addition to the National Book Awards for The Field of Vision and Plains Song.
He was granted Guggenheim Fellowships in 1942, 1946, and 1954.  In 1975, he won the Mari Sandoz Award recognizing "significant, enduring contribution to the Nebraska book world".  In 1979, he received the Western Literature Association's Distinguished Achievement Award.  In 1981, he won the Los Angeles Times' Book Prize Robert Kirsch Award for lifetime achievement.  In 1982, a jury of Modern Language Association members selected him for the Common Wealth Award for distinguished service in literature.  In 1985, he was one of the inaugural recipients of the Whiting Award. In 1986, he was honored with a Creative Writing Fellowship from the National Endowment for the Arts.

Archives

The full archive of Wright Morris photographs is located at the Center for Creative Photography (CCP) at the University of Arizona in Tucson, which also manages the copyright of these photographs.

The Lincoln City Libraries of Lincoln, NE, houses some Morris correspondence and taped interviews in The Gale E. Christianson Collection of Eiseley Research Materials and The Wright Morris-Victor Musselman Correspondence collection.

The University of Nebraska-Lincoln Libraries houses a collection of Wright Morris papers, including material donated by Josephine Morris (1927-2002), widow of Wright Morris.

Historical places in the life of Wright Morris

Wright Morris wrote about the places and lives he knew.  Here are a few of the most historic.
 Cahow Barber Shop
 Patterson Law Office
 Wright Morris Boyhood House

Notes

References

External links
 Official sites
 Wright Morris (Lone Tree Literary Society) Website
 
Western American Literature Journal: Wright Morris
 Guide to the Wright Morris Papers at The Bancroft Library
 
 Profile at The Whiting Foundation
 Stuart Wright Collection: Wright Morris Papers, 1950–1985 (#1169-008), East Carolina Manuscript Collection, J. Y. Joyner Library, East Carolina University

Further reading
 
 
 

1910 births
1998 deaths
People from Central City, Nebraska
20th-century American novelists
American male novelists
National Book Award winners
Photographers from Nebraska
20th-century American male writers
San Francisco State University faculty
Pomona College alumni
Members of the American Academy of Arts and Letters